The Zaër  is an Arab tribal confederacy of mixed Maqil-Arab  origins. 

The confederacy is composed of two tribal groups : Kefiane and Mzar'a. The Kefiane group is settling the western and southern part of the Confederacy's territory and is made of 7 tribes: Beni Obeid, Slamna, Uled Zeid, Uled Daho, Hlalef, Ruashed, and Mkhalef. The second group, Mzar'a, is settling in the eastern part of the territory and is made of 6 tribes: Nejda, Uled Ali, Gsisset, Brashua, Uled Ktir, and Uled Khelifa.

The Zaër first settled in the highlands and the northern edge of the Sahara and southern High Atlas. Leo Africanus wrote in the early sixteenth century that they settled in the region of Khenifra, and later continued on to the north to the Rabat region.

In the early 1910s a brief conflict would break out between French colonial forces and Zaër tribesmen following the death of a French lieutenant. France would emerge victorious following this brief period of violence and subsequently seize Morocco as a protectorate in 1912.

See also 
 Maqil tribe
 Khenifra (city)
 Rabat (city)
 Morocco
 North African Arabs

References 

Arab tribes in Morocco